Michael Glenn Sinclair (born January 31, 1968) is a former American football defensive end and defensive line coach. He played 11 seasons in the National Football League (NFL) with the Seattle Seahawks and the Philadelphia Eagles. Sinclair was a three-time Pro Bowler in 1996, 1997 and 1998. He led the NFL in sacks in 1998 with 16.5, which is also the Seahawks single season franchise record.

Sinclair won the World Bowl as defensive line coach for the Hamburg Sea Devils in NFL Europa in 2007. He was named the defensive line coach for the Montreal Alouettes in January 2008, where he spent five seasons and won two Grey Cup championships. On January 18, 2013, Sinclair followed Alouettes head coach Marc Trestman to the Chicago Bears. Sinclair was fired on January 25, 2014.

Honors
 Most sacks of any member of the entire 1991 draft class 
 Sacked John Elway more than any other player
 Sports Illustrated NFL Mid-season 1st Team 
 Seahawks Top Ten Defensive Players of All Time
 Seahawks All-time Team

References

1968 births
Living people
Sportspeople from Galveston, Texas
American football defensive ends
Eastern New Mexico Greyhounds football players
Seattle Seahawks players
Sacramento Surge players
Philadelphia Eagles players
American Conference Pro Bowl players
Hamburg Sea Devils coaches
Montreal Alouettes coaches
Chicago Bears coaches
Saskatchewan Roughriders coaches